Loyal London was an 80-gun second-rate ship of the line of the Royal Navy, launched on 10 June 1666 at Deptford Dockyard with a burthen of 1,236 tons. She was established with 80 guns comprising 22 cannon-of-seven, four demi-cannon, 26 culverins and 28 demi-culverins; in July 1666 this was raised to 92 guns, comprising seven cannon-of-seven, 19 demi-cannon, 28 culverins, 26 12-pounders and 12 demi-culverins.

Loyal London was destroyed by fire on 14 June 1667, during the Dutch Raid on the Medway. A quantity of her timbers were salvaged on 15 July, and were transported to Deptford for reuse in construction of the 96-gun first rate .

Notes

Citations

References
 
 
 

Ships of the line of the Royal Navy
1660s ships
Ships built in Deptford
Maritime incidents in 1667